Brexiella is a genus of flowering plants belonging to the family Celastraceae.

Its native range is Madagascar.

Species:

Brexiella cymosa 
Brexiella ilicifolia

References

Celastraceae
Celastrales genera
Taxa named by Joseph Marie Henry Alfred Perrier de la Bâthie